Downhauler is the fifth studio release by Rhode Island–based singer-songwriter Marc Douglas Berardo. All songs were written by Berardo with the exception of Quiet Places which was co-written with Abbie Gardner, Laurie McCallister and Carolann Solebello of Red Molly.

Downhauler was ranked No. 20 on the Folk DJ-L radio list of Top Albums and Songs of 2011.

In the review of the album, Roger Zee of WorkingMusician.com had this to say, "These songs examine the dreams and hopes that motivate us all."

Track listing
 "Ruby" 
 "Something Real (Neal and Jenny)" 
 "Smokegun Jack Daydreams"
 "Cuba 1953"
 "Havana"
 "Better Days" 
 "Everything Will Be Alright"
 "Ruby Reprise"
 "Passing Through"
 "Quiet Places" With Red Molly
 "Thinking It Over"

Personnel

Musicians
 Marc Douglas Berardo – vocals, background vocals, acoustic guitar, nylon classical guitar, percussion
 Dick Neal – electric guitars, banjo
 Paulie Triff – drums, percussion
 Scott LeBish – drums
 Arturo Baguer – bass, Cuban bass
 Jordan Jancz – bass
 Larry Deming – violin, harmonium
 Liam Bailey – banjo, fiddles
 Chris Berardo – vocals, harmonica, tambourine, percussion, background vocals, harmony vocals
 Vic Steffans – electric piano, keys, keyboard, Hammond organ B-3, drums
 Laurie McCallister – vocals, banjo
 Carolann Solebello – vocals
 Abbie Gardner – Dobro, vocals
 Pete Szymanksi – bass
 Jim Kimball – accordion

Production
Produced by: Dick Neal and Marc Douglas Berardo
Engineered by: Dick Neal and Vic Steffens
Mixed by: Dick Neal and Vic Steffens 
Mastered by: Vic Steffens at Horizon Studio, West Haven, Connecticut March 2010

Artwork
Photography: Kim Mitchell
Graphic Design and Layout: Marc Douglas Berardo and Chris Brown

References

2011 albums
Marc Douglas Berardo albums